Alyosha Abrahamyan (29 August 1945 – 26 August 2018) was an Armenian footballer who played as a goalkeeper for FC Ararat Yerevan.

External links

Profile at KLISF

1945 births
2018 deaths
Footballers from Gyumri
Armenian footballers
Association football goalkeepers
Soviet footballers
Soviet Armenians
Soviet Top League players
FC Ararat Yerevan players